The Hewlett-Packard HP 110 (aka HP Portable and HP 45710A) is an MS-DOS compatible portable computer released in 1984. It has an 80 character by 16 line monochrome liquid crystal display, runs MS-DOS 2.11 in ROM, and has the application programs MemoMaker, Terminal Emulator and Lotus 1-2-3 in ROM.

The LCD can be tilted for visibility, and can be folded down over the keyboard for transport, unlike computers such as the TRS-80 Model 100 which has the display in the same fixed plane as the keyboard. The HP 110 is similar to the Dulmont Magnum and the Sharp PC-5000, but all three computers were separately developed by their respective companies.

HP 110 Plus
In 1985 the HP 110 Plus (aka HP Portable Plus and HP 45711A) was released with a higher-speed internal modem (1200 baud vs. 300 baud), more resident applications, reduced price, and an 80 character by 25 line display, which improved compatibility with desktop software applications. In text mode, the machine supported either a derivation of the 1984 version of the HP Roman-8 character set (in "HP mode") or IBM code page 437 (in "ALT mode").

Reception
BYTE in January 1985 acknowledged the HP 110's high price, but stated that it was "a computer with true desktop capability and performance well worth its cost for those who need the power". It praised the keyboard, and predicted that the built-in Lotus 1-2-3 "will likely account for more HP 110 sales than any other single feature".

Creative Computing said that the 110 was "the overwhelming winner" in the category of notebook portables when "price is no object" for 1984. The magazine stated that the $2995 price was "surprising modest" for its hardware, Lotus 1-2-3 and other software, and excellent manufacturer support.

See also
HP 95LX
HP 100LX
HP 200LX

Notes

References

External links
 Review of HP 110
 
 

110
Computer-related introductions in 1984